Panine betaherpesvirus 2 (PnHV-2) is a species of virus in the genus Cytomegalovirus, subfamily Betaherpesvirinae, family Herpesviridae, and order Herpesvirales.

Chimpanzees serve as natural hosts.

References 

Betaherpesvirinae